The Super Zimbabwe African People's Union was a militant organization, made up of former members of the Rhodesian Security Forces, which operated in Zimbabwe in the 1980s. Super ZAPU members worked for either Ian Smith, the former Prime Minister of Rhodesia; Abel Muzorewa, the first and only Prime Minister of Zimbabwe Rhodesia; Ndabaningi Sithole, the founder of the Zimbabwe African National Union; or the apartheid Government of South Africa.

Author Joseph Hanlon argues in Beggar Your Neighbours: Apartheid power in Southern Africa that Super ZAPU members were former Zimbabwe People's Revolutionary Army fighters who fought on behalf of the South African government.

References

Rebel groups in Zimbabwe
Aftermath of the Rhodesian Bush War
Terrorism in Zimbabwe